Dantivarman  was an Indian monarch who ruled the Pallava kingdom from 795 to 846 CE He was the son of Nandivarman II.

Reign 
Dantivarman ruled the Pallava kingdom for 51 years. During his reign, the decline of the kingdom had set in. Pandyan intrusions in the south reduced the Pallava territory to areas in and around Kanchipuram. In  803 CE, the Rashtrakuta king Govinda III defeated him and entered Kanchi.

Notes

References 
 

9th-century Indian monarchs
Pallava kings
846 deaths
Year of birth unknown